This was the first edition of the tournament.

Nam Ji-sung and Song Min-kyu won the title after defeating Teymuraz Gabashvili and Sasikumar Mukund 7–6(7–3), 6–2 in the final.

Seeds

Draw

References

External links
 Main draw

International Challenger Baotou - Doubles